Lovebound is a 1923 American drama film directed by Henry Otto and written by Josephine Quirk and Jules Furthman. The film stars Shirley Mason, Alan Roscoe, Richard Tucker, Joseph W. Girard, Edward Martindel and Fred Kelsey. The film was released on April 15, 1923, by Fox Film Corporation.

Cast              
Shirley Mason as Bess Belwyn
Alan Roscoe as John Mobley 
Richard Tucker as Paul Meredith
Joseph W. Girard as David Belwyn 
Edward Martindel as Stephen Barker
Fred Kelsey as Detective Hahn

References

External links
 

1923 films
1920s English-language films
Silent American drama films
1923 drama films
Fox Film films
Films directed by Henry Otto
American silent feature films
American black-and-white films
1920s American films